The Rawang railway station is a railway station in Rawang, Gombak District, Selangor, Malaysia that is served by the KTM Komuter (of the Port Klang Line since 2015) and the KTM ETS train services.

It was the northernmost terminus for passenger services on the Rawang-Seremban Route since the start of the KTM Komuter service until 2015 when the trial route between Rawang and Port Klang began operating to cater to the KTM double track upgrading project. In 2016, the line Rawang-Port Klang Line was merged with the Rawang-Tanjung Malim shuttle service, thus ending Rawang's role as the northern terminus of the line.

The station built to cater the traffic around the suburb of Rawang as there were no other commuter or mass transit services in the Klang Valley that stopped here before the arrival of the KTM Komuter.

Extension
On April 21, 2007, a shuttle service between Rawang and Rasa was launched. The service, which extends the KTM Komuter network by 22 km, covers three new stations, namely Serendah, Batang Kali and Rasa. This is the first stretch of the problem-prone and much-delayed Rawang-Ipoh electrification and double-tracking project to become operational. This service was extended to Kuala Kubu Bharu on January 5, 2008. On June 1, 2009, the service was further extended to Tanjung Malim.
For more details on the extension, see Rawang-Tanjung Malim Shuttle Route.

References

External links
 KL MRT & KTM Komuter Integration

Gombak District
KTM ETS railway stations
Rawang-Seremban Line
Railway stations in Selangor
Rapid transit stations in Selangor